The 2018 FIFA World Cup was an international football tournament held in Russia from 14 June to 15 July 2018. The 32 national teams involved in the tournament were required to register a squad of 23 players, including three goalkeepers. Only players in these squads were eligible to take part in the tournament.

A provisional list of 35 players per national team was submitted to FIFA by 14 May 2018, one month prior to the opening match of the tournament. From the preliminary squad, the final list of 23 players per national team was submitted to FIFA by 4 June, 10 days prior to the opening match of the tournament. FIFA published the final lists with squad numbers on their website the same day. Teams were permitted to make late replacements in the event of serious injury, at any time up to 24 hours before their first match, where the replacement players did not need to be in the preliminary squad.

For players named in the 35-player preliminary squad, there was a mandatory rest period between 21 and 27 May 2018, except for those involved in the 2018 UEFA Champions League Final played on 26 May. Initially the preliminary squads were to have 30 players but, in February 2018, it was announced that the number of players to be named in the provisional squads was increased to 35.

The position listed for each player is per the official squad list published by FIFA. The age listed for each player is on 14 June 2018, the first day of the tournament. The numbers of caps and goals listed for each player do not include any matches played after the start of the tournament. The club listed is the club for which the player last played a competitive match prior to the tournament. The nationality for each club reflects the national association (not the league) to which the club is affiliated. A flag is included for coaches who are of a different nationality than their own national team.

Group A

Egypt
Coach:  Héctor Cúper

Egypt's 29-man preliminary squad was announced on 13 May 2018. The final squad was announced on 4 June.

Russia
Coach: Stanislav Cherchesov

Russia's 28-man preliminary squad was announced on 11 May 2018. Ruslan Kambolov withdrew injured and was replaced by Sergei Ignashevich on 14 May. The final squad was announced on 3 June.

Saudi Arabia
Coach:  Juan Antonio Pizzi

Saudi Arabia's 28-man preliminary squad was announced on 17 May 2018. The final squad was announced on 4 June.

Uruguay
Coach: Óscar Tabárez

Uruguay's 26-man preliminary squad was announced on 15 May 2018. The final squad was announced on 2 June.

Group B

Iran
Coach:  Carlos Queiroz

Iran's 35-man preliminary squad was announced on 13 May 2018. The squad was reduced to 24 players on 20 May. The final squad was announced on 4 June.

Morocco
Coach:  Hervé Renard

Morocco's 26-man preliminary squad was announced on 17 May 2018. The final squad was announced on 4 June.

Portugal
Coach: Fernando Santos

Portugal's 35-man preliminary squad was announced on 14 May 2018. The final squad was announced on 17 May.

Spain
Coach: Fernando Hierro

Spain's final squad was announced on 21 May 2018. Coach Julen Lopetegui was sacked and replaced by Fernando Hierro on 13 June.

Group C

Australia
Coach:  Bert van Marwijk

Australia's 32-man preliminary squad was announced on 6 May 2018. The squad was reduced to 26 players on 14 May, then extended to 27 players on 28 May. The final squad was announced on 3 June.

Denmark
Coach:  Åge Hareide

Denmark's 35-man preliminary squad was announced on 14 May 2018. The squad was reduced to 27 players on 27 May. The final squad was announced on 3 June.

France
Coach: Didier Deschamps

France's final squad was announced on 17 May 2018.

Peru
Coach:  Ricardo Gareca

Peru's 24-man preliminary squad was announced on 16 May 2018. The final squad was initially announced on 30 May, but was extended to 24 players on 31 May after the suspension of Paolo Guerrero was lifted. The final squad was announced on 4 June.

Group D

Argentina
Coach: Jorge Sampaoli

Argentina's 35-man preliminary squad was announced on 14 May 2018. The final squad was announced on 21 May. Sergio Romero withdrew injured and was replaced by Nahuel Guzmán on 23 May. Manuel Lanzini withdrew injured and was replaced by Enzo Pérez on 9 June.

Croatia
Coach: Zlatko Dalić

Croatia's 32-man preliminary squad was announced on 14 May 2018. The squad was reduced to 24 players on 21 May. The final squad was announced on 4 June.

Iceland
Coach: Heimir Hallgrímsson

Iceland's final squad was announced on 11 May 2018.

Nigeria
Coach:  Gernot Rohr

Nigeria's 30-man preliminary squad was announced on 14 May 2018. The squad was reduced to 29 players on 27 May as Moses Simon withdrew injured, then to 25 players on 30 May. The final squad was announced on 3 June.

Group E

Brazil
Coach: Tite

Brazil's final squad was announced on 14 May 2018.

Costa Rica
Coach: Óscar Ramírez

Costa Rica's final squad was announced on 14 May 2018. Rónald Matarrita withdrew injured and was replaced by Kenner Gutiérrez on 15 June.

Serbia
Coach: Mladen Krstajić

Serbia's 27-man preliminary squad was announced on 24 May 2018. The final squad was announced on 1 June.

Switzerland
Coach: Vladimir Petković

Switzerland's 26-man preliminary squad was announced on 25 May 2018. The final squad was announced on 4 June.

Group F

Germany
Coach: Joachim Löw

Germany's 27-man preliminary squad was announced on 15 May 2018. The final squad was announced on 4 June.

Mexico
Coach:  Juan Carlos Osorio

Mexico's 28-man preliminary squad was announced on 14 May 2018. The squad was reduced to 27 players on 23 May as Néstor Araujo withdrew injured, then to 24 players on 2 June. The final squad was announced on 4 June. Diego Reyes withdrew injured and was replaced by Érick Gutiérrez on 13 June.

South Korea
Coach: Shin Tae-yong

South Korea's 28-man preliminary squad was announced on 14 May 2018. The squad was reduced to 26 players on 22 May as Kwon Chang-hoon and Lee Keun-ho withdrew injured. The final squad was announced on 2 June.

Sweden
Coach: Janne Andersson

Sweden's final squad was announced on 15 May 2018.

Group G

Belgium
Coach:  Roberto Martínez

Belgium's 28-man preliminary squad was announced on 21 May 2018. The final squad was announced on 4 June.

England
Coach: Gareth Southgate

England's final squad was announced on 16 May 2018.

Panama
Coach:  Hernán Darío Gómez

Panama's 35-man preliminary squad was announced on 14 May 2018. The final squad was announced on 30 May. Alberto Quintero withdrew injured and was replaced by Ricardo Ávila on 6 June.

Tunisia
Coach: Nabil Maâloul

Tunisia's 29-man preliminary squad was announced on 14 May 2018. The final squad was announced on 2 June.

Group H

Colombia
Coach:  José Pékerman

Colombia's 35-man preliminary squad was announced on 14 May 2018. The final squad was announced on 4 June. Frank Fabra withdrew injured and was replaced by Farid Díaz on 9 June.

Japan
Coach: Akira Nishino

Japan's 27-man preliminary squad was announced on 18 May 2018. The final squad was announced on 31 May.

Poland
Coach: Adam Nawałka

Poland's 35-man preliminary squad was announced on 11 May 2018. The squad was reduced to 32 players on 18 May. The final squad was announced on 4 June.

Senegal
Coach: Aliou Cissé

Senegal's final squad was announced on 17 May 2018. Saliou Ciss withdrew injured and was replaced by Adama Mbengue on 17 June.

Statistics

Age
At , Egypt's Essam El Hadary was the oldest player and oldest captain, as well as the oldest player to ever be named to a FIFA World Cup squad. Mexico's Rafael Márquez was the oldest outfield player at 39. The youngest captain was England's Harry Kane, at 24 years of age.

The average age of all 736 players – almost 28 years – was the oldest in the tournament's history.

Players
Oldest:  Essam El Hadary
Youngest:  Daniel Arzani

Goalkeepers
Oldest:  Essam El Hadary
Youngest:  Francis Uzoho

Captains
Oldest:  Essam El Hadary
Youngest:  Harry Kane

Player representation by league system
League systems with 20 or more players represented are listed. In all, World Cup squad members played for clubs in 57 countries, and played in 54 national league systems, as the league systems of England and France included clubs from Wales and Monaco respectively, and one league system covered both the United States and Canada.

 The England squad was made up entirely of players from the country's domestic league.
 The Belgium squad had the most players from a single foreign federation, with eleven players employed in England.
 Of the countries not represented by a national team at the World Cup, Italy's league provided the most squad members, with 58.
 Two squads (Senegal and Sweden) were made up entirely of players employed by overseas clubs. Senegal's league was also the only one of the participants' leagues that did not send any players to the tournament (players in the Swedish league represented Iceland, Iran and Costa Rica).
 Four squads had only one domestic-based player (Belgium, Iceland, Nigeria, and Switzerland).
 Only two players were from a third-tier league (Egypt's Sam Morsy of Wigan Athletic in England, and Panama's Ismael Díaz of Deportivo Fabril in Spain)

Player representation by club
Clubs with 10 or more players represented are listed.

Player representation by club confederation

Coaches representation by country
Coaches in bold represented their own country.

Notes

References

External links

Squads
FIFA World Cup squads